This is a list of cities, towns and villages in Andorra. The country, divided into 7 parishes, counts 44 official statistical poblacions (i.e.: towns and villages) and other villages.

List

1. Les Escaldes and Engordany are former villages and nowadays the parish of Escaldes-Engordany is only one city.

Largest towns

As of 2019-12-31, Source: CityPopulation

References

External links

 
 
Andorra, List of cities in
Cities